Conneaut Lake  is a borough in Crawford County, Pennsylvania, located at the southern end of the lake of the same name. The population was 626 at the 2020 census, down from 653 at the 2010 census.

History
The town was founded in 1799 as "Evansburg", named for local farmer Abner Evans. It took the name of the neighboring lake in 1892.

Geography
Conneaut Lake borough is located southwest of the center of Crawford County at  (41.602322, -80.306733). Its northeastern border follows Second Street, which parallels the southwestern shore of Conneaut Lake, the largest natural lake in Pennsylvania. The entire borough is surrounded by Sadsbury Township, a separate municipality.

U.S. routes 6 and 322 pass through the borough, leading east together  to Meadville, the Crawford County seat.

Demographics

As of the census of 2000, there were 708 people, 331 households, and 187 families residing in the borough. The population density was 1,927.9 people per square mile (738.8/km²). There were 370 housing units at an average density of 1,007.5 per square mile (386.1/km²). The racial makeup of the borough was 97.18% White, 0.14% African American, 0.14% Native American, 1.98% Asian, 0.14% Pacific Islander, and 0.42% from two or more races. Hispanic or Latino of any race were 0.42% of the population.

There were 331 households, out of which 22.7% had children under the age of 18 living with them, 41.7% were married couples living together, 11.5% had a female householder with no husband present, and 43.5% were non-families. 35.6% of all households were made up of individuals, and 15.7% had someone living alone who was 65 years of age or older. The average household size was 2.14 and the average family size was 2.80.

In the borough the population was spread out, with 20.3% under the age of 18, 7.6% from 18 to 24, 27.3% from 25 to 44, 26.0% from 45 to 64, and 18.8% who were 65 years of age or older. The median age was 40 years. For every 100 females there were 87.3 males. For every 100 females age 18 and over, there were 83.1 males.

The median income for a household in the borough was $34,306, and the median income for a family was $42,375. Males had a median income of $35,000 versus $21,417 for females. The per capita income for the borough was $18,486. About 5.5% of families and 7.5% of the population were below the poverty line, including 8.2% of those under age 18 and 11.7% of those age 65 or over.

References

External links

Conneaut Lake Area Business Association

Populated places established in 1796
Boroughs in Crawford County, Pennsylvania
1796 establishments in Pennsylvania